Agusan is a Manobo language of northeastern Mindanao in the Philippines.

Distribution and dialects
Agusan Manobo (consisting of the Umayam, Adgawan, Surigao, and Omayamnon dialects) is spoken in the following areas.

Agusan del Sur Province: western area, southeast of Lake Buluan
inland areas of Surigao del Sur Province
southwest of Lanuza Peninsula to Lianga Bay in Surigao del Sur Province
western Agusan del Norte Province
Compostela Valley and Davao del Norte provinces: continuous strip along northern borders
Surigao del Norte Province: southern tip, inland
scattered small border areas of Bukidnon and Davao Oriental provinces

Dibabawon Manobo is spoken in the following areas.
northern Compostela Valley Province: upper Agusan River area
Davao Oriental Province: Boston and Cateel municipalities
Davao del Norte Province: Asuncion municipality (in Manguagan)

Rajah Kabunsuwan Manobo is spoken in the following areas.
northern border of Davao Oriental Province
southeast corner of Agusan del Sur Province
southern Surigao del Sur Province: Lingig (in Rajah Cabungsuan)

The Omayamnon, Dibabawon, and Rajah Kabunsuwan dialects are divergent.

Phonology

Consonants
In Agusan, the stops have unreleased variants when occurring before another consonant, silence, and in syllable-final position. The glottal stop  occurs in all consonant positions. Of the continuants, all occur in syllable-initial position and all except  in word-final position.

Vowels
Vowels may appear alone, after a consonant, or between consonants in a syllable. The vowel  never occurs next to the consonant .

References

Manobo languages
Languages of Agusan del Norte
Languages of Agusan del Sur